Frank Alfred Marsales (31 August 188614 August 1975) was a Canadian composer best known for his work scoring many classic animated films by Warner Bros. Cartoons in the 1930s.  He also worked with Walter Lantz Studios in the mid to late 1930s.

Cartoon career 
Marsales was a symphony musician who became the music director for Warner Bros. Cartoons under the direction of former Disney animators Hugh Harman (1903–1982) and Rudolf Ising (1903–1992), scoring many classic cartoons in the 1930s, including every Harman & Ising Looney Tune and Merrie Melodie. His first credit was for Sinkin' in the Bathtub, released May 1930 and animated by Friz Freleng. He composed the music to the 1931 Merrie Melody Lady, Play Your Mandolin!. His last credit for Warner Brothers was in 1933 with Bosko's Picture Show. He left Warner Brothers when Harman and Ising left the studio (but not with them), missing out on scoring their work at Paramount for the 1933 animated Alice in Wonderland – Marsales may also have had a hand injury at that time that precluded his composing any music at all.

In the mid-1930s, Marsales began work at Walter Lantz Studios as musical director for the Andy Panda cartoons, among others.  Marsales's last credited musical score at Walter Lantz Studios was for Knock Knock, released 25 November 1940 (although he may also have scored some part of Syncopated Sioux, released 30 December 1940, which musical director was uncredited). Music from Marsales's work for Lantz also found its way into the 1957 animated television series The Woody Woodpecker Show, which contained not only new cartoons, but also Woody's (and other) theatrical Lantz cartoons from the previous twenty years.

Personal life 
Marsales was born in Yonker, Saskatchewan, Canada on 31 August 1886, the son of Robert Lambert Marsales and Lena Burns.  He lived most of his life in California. Marsales married Catherine Elizabeth Murset (30 April 188913 Jan 1971). They had no children.  He died 14 August 1975 in Long Beach, California.

References

External links

1886 births
1975 deaths
Place of birth missing
Canadian television composers
Canadian film score composers
Male film score composers
20th-century Canadian composers
Warner Bros. Cartoons music composers
20th-century Canadian male musicians
Walter Lantz Productions people
Canadian expatriate musicians in the United States